The 2010 Aberto de Brasília was a professional tennis tournament played on outdoor hard courts. It was the second edition of the tournament which was part of the 2010 ATP Challenger Tour. It took place in Brasília, Brazil between 9 and 14 August 2010.

ATP entrants

Seeds

 Rankings are as of August 2, 2010.

Other entrants
The following players received wildcards into the singles main draw:
  Guilherme Clézar
  Rogério Dutra da Silva
  Augusto Laranja
  Fernando Romboli

The following player received an Alternate entry into the singles main draw:
  Charles-Antoine Brézac

The following players received entry from the qualifying draw:
  Robert Farah
  Marcel Felder
  Fabrice Martin
  Nicholas Monroe

Champions

Singles

 Tatsuma Ito def.  Izak van der Merwe, 6–4, 6–4

Doubles

 Franco Ferreiro /  André Sá def.  Ricardo Mello /  Caio Zampieri, 7–6(5), 6–3

External links
Official website
ITF search 
2010 Draws

Aberto de Brasilia
Aberto de Brasília
Aberto de Brasilia
Aberto de Brasília